"Great Scott!" is an interjection of surprise, amazement, or dismay.  It is a distinctive but inoffensive exclamation, popular in the second half of the 19th century and the early 20th century, and now considered dated.

It originated as a minced oath, historically associated with two specific "Scotts": Scottish author Sir Walter Scott and, later, US general Winfield Scott.

Origins
It is frequently assumed that Great Scott! is a minced oath of some sort, Scott replacing God.
The 2010 edition of the Oxford Dictionary of English labels the expression as "dated" and simply identifies it as an "arbitrary euphemism for 'Great God!'".

Alternatively, but similarly, it has been suggested that it may be a corruption of the South German / Austrian greeting Grüß Gott.

Sir Walter Scott
An early reference to Sir Walter Scott as the "great Scott" is found in the poem "The Wars of Bathurst 1830" published in The Sydney Monitor on 27 October 1830, still during Scott's lifetime; the pertinent line reading "Unlike great Scott, who fell at Waterloo", in reference to Scott's poorly-received The Field of Waterloo.

An explicit connection of Sir Walter Scott's name with the then familiar exclamation is found in a poem published 15 August 1871, on the centenary anniversary of Scott's birth:

Mark Twain uses the phrase to reference Sir Walter Scott and his writing. Twain's disdain for Scott is evident in A Connecticut Yankee in King Arthur's Court (1889), in which the main character repeatedly utters "great Scott" as an oath, and in The Adventures of Huckleberry Finn (1884), where he names a sinking boat the Walter Scott.

Winfield Scott
John William De Forest, in Miss Ravenel's Conversion from Secession to Loyalty (1867) reports the exclamation as referring to Winfield Scott, general‑in‑chief of the U.S. Army from 1841 to 1861:

The general, known to his troops as Old Fuss and Feathers, weighed 300 pounds (21 stone or 136 kg) in his later years and was too fat to ride a horse. A May 1861 edition of The New York Times included the sentence:

The phrase appears in a 3 May 1864 diary entry by Private Robert Knox Sneden (later published as Eye of the Storm: a Civil War Odyssey):

In the July 1871 issue of The Galaxy, in the story "Overland", the expression is again used by author by J. W. DeForest:

A large basalt rock collected by astronaut David Scott on the Apollo 15 mission to the moon in 1971 is informally known as Great Scott.

References

English phrases
Interjections